Lady Evelyn may refer to:

Places
Lady Evelyn Hotel, a former hotel in Ontario, Canada
Lady Evelyn Lake, a lake in Ontario, Canada
Lady Evelyn River, a river in Ontario, Canada
Lady Evelyn-Smoothwater Provincial Park, a park in Ontario, Canada

People
Evelyn Beauchamp (1901–1980), daughter of George Herbert, 5th Earl of Carnarvon
Lady Evelyn Stewart Murray (1868–1940), a Scottish folklorist
Lady Eve Balfour (1898–1990), a British farmer, educator and organic farming pioneer

Other
HMCS Lady Evelyn, a Royal Canadian Navy patrol boat
Snaefell Wheel, also known as Lady Evelyn, a waterwheel on the Isle of Man